Karl August Joseph Maria Maximilian Lamoral Antonius Ignatius Benediktus Valentin, 10th Prince of Thurn and Taxis (full German name: Karl August Joseph Maria Maximilian Lamoral Antonius Ignatius Benediktus Valentin Fürst von Thurn und Taxis; 23 July 1898 – 26 April 1982) was the tenth Prince of Thurn and Taxis and Head of the Princely House of Thurn and Taxis from 13 July 1971 until his death on 26 April 1982.

Early life and education

Karl August was the third son and child of Albert, 8th Prince of Thurn and Taxis, and his wife, Archduchess Margarethe Klementine of Austria. After graduating from a local high school, Karl August studied science at the University of Würzburg.

Marriage and family
Karl August married Princess Maria Anna of Braganza, daughter of Miguel, Duke of Braganza, and his wife Princess Maria Theresa of Löwenstein-Wertheim-Rosenberg, on 18 August 1921 at Schloss Taxis in Dischingen, Baden-Württemberg, Germany. Karl August and Maria Ana had four children:

Princess Clotilde of Thurn and Taxis (30 November 1922 – 1 September 2009) married Prince Hans-Moritz of Liechtenstein (son of Prince Alfred Roman of Liechtenstein)
Princess Mafalda of Thurn and Taxis (6 March 1924 – 24 July 1989) married Prince Franz of Thurn and Taxis (a distant cousin)
Johannes, 11th Prince of Thurn and Taxis (5 June 1926 – 28 December 1990) married countess Gloria Von Schonbürg-Glauchau (daughter of Count Joachim, Count of Schönburg-Glauchau and Countess Beatrix Széchenyi de Sárvár-Felsővidék) 
Prince Albert of Thurn and Taxis (23 January 1930 – 4 February 1935)

After his marriage, Karl August and his wife resided at Schloss Höfling in Regensburg where he managed the family's agricultural interests in nearby Burgweinting. As a committed opponent to Nazism, Karl August forbade his children, after the Machtergreifung, to join the Hitler Youth.

World War II
Because of his anti-Nazi attitude, Karl August was imprisoned in a Gestapo prison in Landshut from 1944 to 1945.

Later life

After the death of his elder brother Franz Josef in 1971, Karl August was aged 73 when he succeeded as Head of the House of Thurn and Taxis. During this time, he was responsible for the modernization of the agricultural and forestry possessions of the House of Thurn and Taxis, and he built homes for his workers and employees.

In addition, he supported the continued preservation of the cultural-historical heritage of the House of Thurn and Taxis. Karl August restored interior parts of Saint Emmeram's Abbey, as well as tapestries from the 17th and 18th centuries.

After his death on 26 April 1982, Karl August was entombed in the chapel of Saint Emmeram's Abbey.

Ancestry

References

1898 births
1982 deaths
People from Starnberg (district)
Princes of Thurn und Taxis
German landowners
Knights of the Order of St. Sylvester
German Roman Catholics
University of Würzburg alumni
Burials at the Gruftkapelle, St. Emmeram's Abbey
Knights Commander of the Order of Merit of the Federal Republic of Germany
Prisoners and detainees of Germany